Kiran Manandhar (born 1957) is a Nepalese artist, who was the founding chancellor of Nepal Academy of Fine Arts from 2010 to 2014. He is considered one of the pioneering Nepalese abstract expressionist painters.

Early life 
Manandhar was born in 1957 (2013 BS) in Kathmandu, Nepal, to father Purna Man Manandhar and mother Bishnu Devi. His father was a mechanic at the Royal Palace. Manandhar was interested in art from childhood. He completed his secondary level education from Juddhodaya Public High School.

Painting career 
Once while he was making sand sculptures on the bank of Bisnumati River, the artist Chandra Man Singh Maskey noticed his work and appreciated it. Maskey gave Manandhar his card and asked him to visit at his place. Manandhar learnt painting related to landscapes, portraits and still life for two years before he was handed to Ramananda Joshi, another prominent Nepalese artist. He studied oil painting with Joshi for the next three years.

Shukla invited Manandhar to study arts in India.

He went to India in 1972 for his higher education and received his graduate and postgraduate degrees in fine arts from Banaras Hindu University. In Banaras, Manandhar met the Nepali Congress leader, BP Koirala, who suggested he go to France to study arts. He completed his masters degree in 1980 from India and returned to Nepal. 

After staying for three years in Nepal, Manandhar went to France to study arts. In France, he won multiple awards. He used to teach French people about their history in France. 

He ran the art gallery for ten years. He used his art in the protests during 1990 and 2006 Nepalese uprisings.

He was one of the key people behind the establishment of Nepal Academy of Fine Arts. The academy was established on 13 April 2010 and he was its chancellor from 2010 to 2014.

Awards and honours 
 Award in Hamari Kala Exhibition, Varanasi (1974)
 Award in National Art Exhibition, Nepal (1974)
 Best Prize in National Art Exhibition Nepal (1983)
 Best prize in National Art Exhibition Nepal (1986)
 Rastriya Pratibha Puraskar, His Majesty's Government, Nepal (1996)
 Medal in Silver Jubilee of King Birendra of Nepal (1997)
 Prabal Gorkha Dakshin Bahu, by King Birendra of Nepal (1999)
 Birendra Aishworya Sewa Padak (2001)

Personal life 
He is married to Sarita Manandhar. They have two children,a son and a daughter. Their son, Sagar Manandhar, is also an artist.

See also 
 Lain Singh Bangdel
 Ragini Upadhyaya

References 

Banaras Hindu University alumni
People from Kathmandu
1957 births
21st-century Nepalese painters
Living people